John Edward Caldwell (born c. 1950) is a Canadian business executive currently on the board of Advanced Micro Devices, Inc., serving as its chair. He also serves as the director of Faro Technologies, Inc., IAMGOLD, and Samuel, Son & Co., Limited. Caldwell received a bachelor of commerce degree from Carleton University in Ontario, Canada, and is a member of the Charted Professional Accountants of Ontario. Throughout his career, he has served on the audit committees of ten public companies.  Caldwell has also been a lecturer on board oversight responsibility for enterprise risk through McMaster University in Canada as part of an accredited board of director education program for several years.

Affiliations 
Caldwell has been associated with a number of institutions, notably including:
 SMTC Corporation (President and CEO, 2003–2011)
 Mosaic Group Inc. (2002-03)
 Geac Computer Corporation (Limited Consultant, 2001-02)
 Geac Computer Corporation (Limited President and CEO, 2000-01)
 CAE (President and CEO, 1993-99)
 CAE (CFO, 1988-92)
 Advanced Micro Devices (Member of board, 2006-)
 ATI Technologies, Inc. (Member of board, 2003-06, to AMD)
 Cognos, Inc. (Member of board, 2000-)
 Faro Technologies (Member of board, 2002-)
 IAMGOLD Corporation (Member of board, 2006-)
 Rothmans Inc. (Member of board, 2004-)
 Sleeman Breweries, Ltd. (Member of board, 2004-)
 SMTC Corporation (Member of board, 2003-, as Chairman, 2004-05, continuing)
 Stelco Inc. (Member of board)

References 

1950 births
Living people
Carleton University alumni
AMD people